Gerhard Arthur Puff (February 13, 1914 – August 12, 1954) was a gangster executed by the federal authorities in New York for killing a federal agent. Born in Dresden, Germany, the 13-year-old Puff, along with his mother and five-year-old brother arrived on June 6, 1927, at Ellis Island on board  from Bremen. The family moved to Milwaukee, Wisconsin, where he became a naturalized citizen in 1934, but by 1940, he was an inmate in the Wisconsin State Prison in Waupun, Wisconsin.

Capture
In 1952, he traveled from Kansas City to Manhattan with his 17-year-old wife, Annie Laurie. By this time, his career as a bank robber had earned him a spot on the FBI's "Ten Most Wanted List". Shortly after he arrived at the Congress Hotel at 19 West 69th Street, FBI agents were waiting to arrest him. He did not remain at Room 904, but returned to the first floor in a few minutes by the stairway where FBI Special Agent Joseph John Brock, aged 44, was stationed. Puff encountered Agent Brock and shot him twice in the chest and took the collapsing officer's gun. Then, with a gun in each hand, Puff zig-zagged through the hotel's lobby, firing another shot at converging agents. Agents outside the hotel called on Puff to surrender. Puff responded with bullets before being shot and collapsing in the street. He was taken to a hospital for treatment, then to the prison ward at Bellevue. Brock was treated by a doctor on the scene, then rushed to a hospital where he was pronounced dead shortly after arrival.

Death
On May 15, 1953, in the United States District Court for the Southern District of New York, Gerhard Arthur Puff was found guilty of murder in the first degree and sentenced to death. Puff's attorney appealed the conviction to no avail. Puff was executed on August 12, 1954, at Sing Sing prison, Ossining, in the electric chair and declared dead at 11:08 p.m. He was one of the first people New York State Electrician Dow Hover was hired to execute. The execution was the fifth federal execution after President Dwight D. Eisenhower took office on January 20, 1953.

See also 

 Capital punishment by the United States federal government
 List of people executed by the United States federal government

References

1910s births
1954 deaths
20th-century executions by New York (state)
20th-century executions by the United States federal government
20th-century executions of American people
American bank robbers
Fugitives
German emigrants to the United States
German people convicted of murder
German people executed abroad
Executed people from Saxony
American people executed for murdering police officers
People convicted of murder by the United States federal government
People convicted of murdering FBI agents
People executed by the United States federal government by electric chair